is a 1972 Japanese drama film directed by Kei Kumai. The film is about a young couple who get together despite the tragedy that befalls their lives. The film received several year end awards from Kinema Junpo and the Mainichi Film Awards.

Cast
 Komaki Kurihara as Shino
 Go Kato as Tetsuro
 Yasushi Nagata as Tetsuro's father
 Kaneko Iwasaki as Kayo - short-sighted sister
 Kinzô Shin as Shino's father
 Hisako Takihana as Tetsuro's mother
 Yûsuke Takita as Yukifusa Kimura
 Hisashi Igawa as Tetsuro's elder brother
 Yasushi Kachi as Fumiya
 Karin Yamaguchi as Aya
 Kin Sugai as Wellwisher on train
 Toshie Kimura as Okami

Release
The Long Darkness was released theatrically in Japan on 25 May 1972 where it was distributed by Toho. The film saw theatrical release in the United States by Toho International with English subtitles in July 1973. It was entered into the 8th Moscow International Film Festival.

Reception
In Japan, Kinema Junpo awarded The Long Darkness with the awards for Best Film, Best Director and Co-Best Screenplay for the year. At the Mainichi Film Award the film won awards for Best Film, Best Actress (Komaki Kurihara), Best Film Score and Best Sound Recording.

See also
 List of Japanese films of 1972

References

Footnotes

Sources

External links
 

1972 films
1972 drama films
Films directed by Kei Kumai
Japanese drama films
Best Film Kinema Junpo Award winners
1970s Japanese films